Jerry Uchechukwu Eze (born 22 August 1982) is a Nigerian pastor and digital evangelist. Eze is the founder of Streams of Joy International, and convener of the New Season Prophetic Prayers and Declaration (NSPPD) an online digital prayer meeting.

Early life 

Eze was born on 22 August 1982, in Umuahia the capital city of Abia State. He hails from Okoko Item, Bende Local Government Area of Abia State, Nigeria. Eze grew up in Umuahia where he attended Ibeku High School, Umuahia, Abia State, Nigeria from 1991 to 1997.

He has a bachelor's degree in History and International Relations from Abia State University, and a postgraduate certification in Business Administration from the Enugu State University of Technology (ESUT) .

Eze worked as a Communications Specialist with the World Bank project for HIV/AIDS and  United Nations Population Fund (UNFPA) before becoming a full time cleric.

Eze is married to Pastor Eno Jerry and they have two children.

Ministry 

Eze started his ministry in 2009 at All Saints Chapel, and in 2013 founded Stream of Joy International Church in Abia State where he serves as the lead pastor. Streams of Joy as at November 2022, has over 13 branches across Nigeria, Canada, the US and United Kingdom. Jerry Eze's ministry is focused on revival, healing.

Eze is known for the tagline, "What God Cannot do, does not exist".

At the inception of Covid-19 , Eze started the digital session called "The New Season Prophetic Prayers and Declarations(NSPPD)", hosted on YouTube and other social media application. The digital session grew to become a leading platform for prayers attracting millions of views daily. The online  prayer session leads in several charts due to the high engagements. l

Books 

 Streams of Joy Daily Devotional (Best Seller)
 Supernatural Parenting 
 Am I making a mistake?
 My Night Thoughts Volumes 1-4
 Resplendent Relationships

References 

1982 births
Living people
21st-century Protestant religious leaders
Nigerian Christian clergy
Nigerian Christian writers
Nigerian Pentecostal pastors